Santa Comba is a municipality of northwestern Spain in the province of A Coruña, in the autonomous community of Galicia. It belongs to the comarca of Xallas.

References

External links
Concello de Santa Comba

Municipalities in the Province of A Coruña